Maria Probst (1 July 1902 – 1 May 1967) was a German politician of the Christian Social Union of Bavaria.

Biography
Daughter of the diplomat Dr Wilhelm Mayer, Maria Probst studied German and history for her doctorate, which she earned in 1930.  She had two daughters of her own from her marriage to Dr Alphonse Probst, who was killed towards the end of the Second World War.  After the war, she worked as a teacher in Hammelburg.

She joined the Christian Social Union of Bavaria (CSU) as a member of the Bavarian Landtag (state parliament of Bavaria) in 1946.  She was a member of the Bundestag from its inception in 1949, representing the Karlstadt constituency.  From 1 October 1952 until 26 June 1953, she led the Parlamentarischen Untersuchungsausschuss zur Prüfung der unzulänglichen Einstellungen von Schwerbeschädigten bei den Bundesdienststellen (roughly, "Parliamentary Committee of Inquiry to Examine Demoralisation in Heavily Damaged Areas in the Federal Departments").  From 1957 to 1965, she was Deputy Chairman of the Bundestagsausschuss für Kriegsopfer- und Heimkehrerfragen (roughly, "Committee for Questions of War Victims and Returnees").  From 9 December 1965 until her death, she was the first woman to occupy the Vice-President's office in the Bundestag.  On 10 May 1967, the Bundestag officially mourned her.

In 1961, she was one of a number of politicians behind an unsuccessful attempt to introduce an Act on academic freedom.

From 27 February 1958 until 21 December 1965, she was also a member of the European Parliament.

Honours
On 3 July 1959, she was awarded the Bavarian Order of Merit. At least ten Frankish communities appointed her an honorary citizen, and a hall, a school, a college and a senior citizens' home were named after her.

Notes

Sources
Biography
 This page was translated from :de:Maria Probst in the German Wikipedia on 25 March 2008

External links
 

1902 births
1967 deaths
Women members of State Parliaments in Germany
Members of the Landtag of Bavaria
MEPs for Germany 1958–1979
20th-century women MEPs for Germany
Commanders Crosses of the Order of Merit of the Federal Republic of Germany
Politicians from Munich